Bahar (also Romanized as Baḩar) is a village in Muran Rural District, in the Soveyseh District of Karun County, Khuzestan Province, Iran. At the 2006 census, its population was 2,011, in 362 families. The village was chosen as the capital of Qaleh Chenan Rural District when it was created on January 23, 2013.

References 

Populated places in Karun County